An Ice-Cream War (1982) is a darkly comic war novel by Scottish author William Boyd, which was nominated for a Booker Prize in the year of its publication.  The title is derived from a quotation in a letter (included in British editions of the book but not the American ones) "Lt Col Stordy says that the war here will only last two months. It is far too hot for sustained fighting, he says, we will all melt like ice-cream in the sun!"

Synopsis 
The story focuses on the East African Campaign fought  between British and German forces during World War I, and how it affects several individual people whose paths converge.

The first character introduced is Temple Smith (Walter Smith in the US edition), an American expatriate farm-owner/mechanic/engineer who runs a successful sisal plantation in British East Africa near Mount Kilimanjaro. Before war breaks out in August 1914, Smith is on cordial terms with his German half-English neighbour, Erich von Bishop. Smith even shops for coffee plant seedlings at the botanical garden in the capital of German East Africa, Dar es Salaam. Major von Bishop burns Smith's sisal and linseed plantation in the opening campaign of the Great War, and then dismantles the massive decorticator, the industrial centrepiece of Smith's sisal farm operations. Now made a penniless refugee, and unable to secure any war reparations from the colonial British bureaucracy, Smith places his wife and children with his missionary father-in-law and joins the British military forces in Nairobi, pursuing personal vengeance against von Bishop over the next four years of the war in East Africa.

The second narrative strand involves Felix Cobb, the studious youngest son of an aristocratic and traditional British military family, everyone of whom he despises apart from his older brother Gabriel, a captain. The latter soon marries his sweetheart Charis (inspiring a certain jealousy in Felix), but war breaks out while Gabriel is on his honeymoon in Normandy, and he makes haste back to his regiment. Gabriel is posted to Africa, where he befriends psychotic fellow soldier Bilderbeck and is wounded in the Battle of Tanga. Whilst recovering in a Prisoner of War hospital, he develops an infatuation for Erich von Bishop's plump, stubborn wife Liesl, who works there as a nurse.

The novel could be considered a satire on the ineptitude of authority in wartime.  A recurring character, District Officer Wheech-Browning, spreads chaos wherever he goes, such that Smith observes that every time he goes somewhere with Wheech-Browning, someone in their company meets an unfortunate death.

Reaction
The novel evokes suggestions of the early Evelyn Waugh as a critic of The New York Times wrote at its time of publication:

References

1982 British novels
Novels set during World War I
Black comedy books
John Llewellyn Rhys Prize-winning works
Novels by William Boyd (writer)
Novels set in Kenya
Hamish Hamilton books